Khabb wa ash Sha'af District is a district of the Al Jawf Governorate, Yemen. As of 2003, the district had a population of 80,193 people. It is the biggest district in Al-Jawf Governorate by population and area but is the least densely populated. It makes up 82% of the total area of Al-Jawf Governorate.

References

Districts of Al Jawf Governorate